Spain competed at the 2004 Summer Paralympics in Athens, Greece. The team included 158 athletes—123 men and 35 women. Spanish competitors won 71 medals, 20 gold, 27 silver and 24 bronze, to finish 7th in the medal table.

Medallists

Sports

Archery

|-
|align=left|Juan Miguel Zarzuela
|align=left|Men's individual standing
|590
|12
|W 151-136
|W 144-142
|L 89-95
|colspan=3|did not advance
|-
|align=left|Manuel Candela
|align=left rowspan=2|Men's individual W2
|597
|13
|W 144-141
|L 150-152
|colspan=4|did not advance
|-
|align=left|Jose Manuel Marin
|596
|14
|W 140-131
|L 139-150
|colspan=4|did not advance
|-
|align=left|Manuel Candela Jose Manuel Marin Juan Miguel Zarzuela
|align=left|Men's team
|1783
|9
|N/A
|L 209-209 ≠
|colspan=4|did not advance
|}

≠ The men's team event round against Slovakia was decided by additional arrows. The Slovak team won 26-18 and were through to the quarterfinals against South Korea.

Athletics

Men's track

Men's field

Women's track

Women's field

Boccia

Individual events

Pairs and teams events

Cycling

Men's road

Men's track

Women's road

Women's track

Goalball

Men's tournament
Spain's men's goalball team didn't win any medals - they were ranked 6th out of 12.

Players
Roberto Abenia
Jose Daniel Fernandez
Vicente Galiana
Ignacio Garrido
Jose Perez
Tomas Rubio

Results

Judo

Men

Women

Sailing

Shooting

Swimming

Men

Women

Table tennis

Wheelchair fencing

Men

Women

Wheelchair tennis

Men

Women

See also
Spain at the Paralympics
Spain at the 2004 Summer Olympics

References 

Nations at the 2004 Summer Paralympics
2004
Paralympics